Stevens Run (Stevens Creek, Tiber) is a  tributary of Rock Creek in Pennsylvania in the United States.

Stevens Run flows over the Gettysburg Battlefield and through the borough of Gettysburg, Pennsylvania.  Within the borough the stream is in a concrete channel, including a covered portion.  From 1884 to 1942, the run was spanned by three bridges of the Round Top Branch railroad.

History
Stevens Run was named after Thaddeus Stevens, a congressman from Pennsylvania.

Samuel Gettys'  Tavern was located on the south side on the uphill slope of the now-named Stevens Run, and Rock Creek Church was approximately on the north bank of the now-named Carlisle Street and Stevens Run.  In 1902, a new bridge was built over the Tiber on Chambersburg Street.

See also
List of rivers of Pennsylvania

References

Rivers of Adams County, Pennsylvania
Rivers of Pennsylvania
Tributaries of the Monocacy River